Southwest Schools is an operator of state charter schools headquartered in Houston, Texas, United States.

The school operates several campuses, including:
  Bissonnet Elementary
 Mangum Elementary
 Discovery Middle School
 Nehemiah Middle School
 Empowerment High School
 Phoenix School
 Young Learners

Former
 Southwest High School (Houston)
 Southwest Middle School (Houston)
 Elementary School (Houston)
 Center for Success and Independence (Houston)
 A Child is Born (Alvin)
 Archway Academy (Houston)
 The PaRC (Houston)
 Carter's Kids (Unincorporated Fort Bend County)
 Three Oaks Academy (Houston)
 Totally Fit Institute (Crosby, Unincorporated Harris County)
 Unlimited Visions  (Pasadena)

See also

 List of state-operated charter schools in Houston

References

External links
 Southwest Schools

Public education in Texas